Rubus sapidus is a Mesoamerican species of brambles in the rose family. It grows in southern Mexico (Chiapas, Oaxaca) and Central America (Guatemala, Honduras, Nicaragua).

Rubus sapidus is an erect or arching perennial with stems up to 2.5 meters long. Stems are covered with wool and armed with curved prickles. Leaves on the stems are compound with 5 leaflets, leathery with soft hairs on the underside; leaves on flower stalks either are simple (not compound) or compound with 3 leaflets. Flowers are white. Fruits are black and spherical.

References

sapidus
Flora of Mexico
Flora of Central America
Plants described in 1839